Uladzimir Ignatik and David Marrero were the defending champions but decided not to participate.
Third seeds Tomasz Bednarek and Andreas Siljeström defeated Grégoire Burquier and Romain Jouan 6–4, 6–7(4), [14–12] in the final.

Seeds

Draw

Draw

External links
 Main Draw

Open Prevadies Saint-Brieuc - Doubles
2011 Doubles